Number 9 Films is a British independent film production company co-founded in 2002 by producers Elizabeth Karlsen and Stephen Woolley, after a long collaboration at both Palace Pictures and Scala Productions. In 2018, Claudia Yusef joined the company as head of development.

Stephen Woolley and Elizabeth Karlsen were jointly honoured with the BAFTA Outstanding British Contribution to Cinema Award in 2019.

In 2019, Number 9 Films entered into a multi-year agreement with film studio and cinema chain Shochiku for distribution of its theatrical films in Japan. The studio would also contribute funding for film development.

Projects
Films produced under the Number 9 Films banner include Breakfast on Pluto, directed by Neil Jordan and recipient of four Irish Film & Television Academy awards, including Best Director, Best Script, and Best Actor in a Lead Role – Film; Made in Dagenham, directed by Nigel Cole and made into a West End musical in 2014; Carol, directed by Todd Haynes, starring Cate Blanchett and Rooney Mara, which received nine BAFTA awards nominations and six Oscar nominations, including Best Actress and Supporting Actress respectively; and Colette, directed by Wash Westmoreland and starring Keira Knightley as the French novelist, released in 2018.

Middle of Somewhere, a biopic written by Phyllis Nagy about British singer Dusty Springfield is in development. The spec script of futuristic drama The Assessor was picked up in 2017. The same year, Mothering Sunday, an adaptation by Alice Birch of the Graham Swift 2016 novel, Mothering Sunday: A Romance, was acquired for development in collaboration with Film4.

The first television project produced by Number 9 Films, in collaboration with Red Production Company, is an adaptation of Henry James' The Portrait of a Lady.

Filmography

Notes

Further reading

 Barraclough, Leo (29 December 2015).   Number 9 Films Offices Reflect Producers’ Personality, Filmography. Variety
 Deadline Hollywood (18 May 2015).   Carol & Youth Producers Stephen Woolley and Elizabeth Karlsen Cannes Interview. YouTube
 DShed (26 November 2015).   Carol: Producer's Intro and Q&A. Watershed
 Ellis-Petersen, Hannah (14 May 2015).   Passion project: meet the indie super-producer behind Cannes hot ticket Carol. The Guardian
 Fitzherbert, Henry (19 May 2013).   Box office success in Stephen Woolley's undead end jobs. Daily Express
 HeyUGuys (7 December 2015).   'Carol' Producer Elizabeth Karlsen – BIFAs 2015. YouTube
 Jaafar, Ali (9 October 2009).  Married to the movies. Variety (Note: contains founding year error.) 
 Jaafar, Ali (2 March 2016). ‘Carol’ Producers Elizabeth Karlsen And Stephen Woolley On Turning Good Taste Into A Business. Deadline Hollywood
 Macnab, Geoffrey (7 July 2011).   Elizabeth Karlsen and Stephen Woolley, Number 9 Films. Screen International (Note: contains founding year error.)
 Mitchell, Wendy (11 December 2015).    'Carol': producer Elizabeth Karlsen on her 14-year passion project. Screen International
 O'Donoghue, Caroline (10 February 2016).   Was Carol snubbed by the Oscars?. The Pool
 Q&A (10 February 2016).  “Strong” women: Why it’s time to redefine the way women are represented on screen – Elizabeth Karlsen, Film Producer and Co-director at Number 9 Films. Womanthology
 Tangcay, Jazz (18 November 2015).   Interview – Carol Producer : Elizabeth Karlsen. AwardsDaily
 Utichi, Joe (18 May 2015).   ‘Carol’ & ‘Youth’ Producers On “The Expectation Of Showing In Cannes” – Video. Deadline Hollywood

References

External links
 
  Number 9 Films at BFI
  Number 9 Films at Metacritic
 Stephen Woolley (3 December 2015).  'Carol' Producer Stephen Woolley: Todd Haynes Film A Cautionary Tale For Threatening Times – Guest Column. Deadline Hollywood

British film studios
Film production companies of the United Kingdom
Companies based in the London Borough of Camden
Mass media companies established in 2002